Jerome "Jeremy" McComb (born in Idaho) is an American country music artist and former tour manager for comedian Larry the Cable Guy. In 2008, he signed to Parallel/New Revolution Records and released his debut album My Side of Town that year. This album produced the singles "Wagon Wheel", "This Town Needs a Bar" and "Cold". Although the first two singles did not chart, "Cold" has become his first entry on the Billboard country charts, debuting at No. 58 in November.

Biography
Jeremy McComb was born in Idaho. His father, Bob, was a local musician who played six nights a week and regularly brought him to venues where he performed. McComb made his singing debut at age eight, when his father invited him to join him onstage to sing Willie Nelson's "On the Road Again". Later on, McComb found work as a music director and disc jockey at the radio station KIXZ-FM in Spokane, Washington.  He then befriended comedian Larry the Cable Guy while working at the station, and was hired as the comedian's tour manager in 2004 at age 23.

McComb began working on his music while serving as Larry's manager. While with the comedian, he was introduced to J.P. Williams, the CEO of Parallel Entertainment. He was then sent to a studio in Spartanburg, South Carolina, where he began recording his debut album. Initially, it was to have been released on a division of Warner Bros. Records, but legal difficulties forced Williams to release it on his own label instead. Entitled My Side of Town, it was released on Parallel/New Revolution in June 2008, and was produced by Paul Riddle of the Marshall Tucker Band. The first single from the album, "Wagon Wheel," was originally recorded by Bob Dylan and later by the Old Crow Medicine Show and Darius Rucker. Following it was "This Town Needs a Bar," which was written by Liz Rose and Jimmy Yeary, and was originally featured in the soundtrack to the film Larry the Cable Guy: Health Inspector. The first two singles both failed to chart, although the third single, "Cold", debuted at number 58 on the Billboard country charts in November 2008 and peaked at number 43.

Country Weekly magazine gave My Side of Town three-and-a-half stars out of five, calling it "one of the year's most encouraging [albums]". "Cold" received a favorable review from the country music review site Roughstock, whose critic Matt Bjorke called it "a ballad which details the difficulties that people sometimes have in getting over a relationship…McComb sings about feeling numb, or 'Cold' about the way that the relationship ended."

Following his major label debut McComb independently released an EP titled "Leap and the Net will Appear". Which included the song "Easy as breathing" co-written with Kevin Kadish (Meghan Trainor / Jason Mraz producer & collaborator) The song while never worked as a single picked up AirPlay across the country.

In 2014, McComb bought the Honky-tonk he started his career in with longtime friend Bob Kreaman. "Nashville North" opened October 22, 2014, and is located in Stateline Idaho and hosts national tour acts and has been Voted the No. 1 live music venue in the region 5 years running.

McComb has continued to carve his path releasing in 2017 a Studio album titled "FM" (Pronounced Eff'um) and in 2018 a LIVE Double album featuring masterful story-telling creating an instant connection with song and audience. Jeremy resides in Nashville, TN and still tours 150 + days a year. There is. a new release just announced to be released in 2020.

Discography

Albums

Singles

Music videos

References

External links
Official website

American country singer-songwriters
Living people
Singer-songwriters from Washington (state)
Year of birth missing (living people)